Nufer is a surname. Notable people with the surname include:

 Jakob Nufer (fl.  1500), Swiss pig-gelder who reportedly performed the first successful Caesarean section
 Julius Nufer (1879–1949), American basketball coach
 Priska Nufer (born 1992), Swiss alpine ski racer